The Goodyear GA-400R Gizmo was a one-man helicopter proposed for duties such as liaison and observation.

Design and development
Goodyear started developing light helicopters in 1954. The GA-400R was the third in the series. The helicopter was not put into production.

The one-man helicopter was designed to be lightweight and simple. The airframe is made of welded aluminum tubing. The rotor blades have wooden cores with fiberglass surfaces. The engine is a Johnson outboard marine engine. The transmission used rubber belts. The Gizmo has demonstrated low autorotation sink rates of 1200 ft/min.

Operational history
First test flights were performed at Akron, Ohio in 1954. The GA-400R was tested by the United States Navy in 1957 at Patuxent River Naval Air Base in Maryland.

In 1966, Goodyear donated the prototype to the EAA Airventure Museum in Oshkosh, Wisconsin and can now be found at the Classic Rotors Museum, Ramona Airport.

Variants
GA-400RA 55 hp Mercury outboard powerplant.
GA-400R-2
GA-400R-3  Johnson two stroke powerplant

Specifications (GA-400R)

References

1950s United States helicopters
Goodyear aircraft
Single-engined piston helicopters
Aircraft first flown in 1954